A Compact Macintosh (or Compact Mac) is an all-in-one Apple Mac computer with a display integrated in the computer case, beginning with the original Macintosh 128K. Compact Macs include the original Macintosh through to the Color Classic sold between 1984 and the mid-1990s. The larger Macintosh LC 500 series, Power Macintosh 5000 series and iMac are not described as a "Compact Mac."

Apple divides these models into five form factors: The Macintosh 128K, Macintosh SE, and Macintosh Classic (all with a  black and white screen), the modernized Macintosh Color Classic with a  color screen, and the very different Macintosh XL.

Models

*220 V international models are appended with the letter "P" (e.g. M0001P)

Timeline

See also
 All-in-one desktop computer

References
 Compact Macs Index and Compact Macs Guide at lowendmac.com
 Early Compact "Classic" Macs at EveryMac

External links

 The Vintage Mac Museum: Compact Mac -9inch/mono Display 68000-

 
Macintosh case designs
Computer-related introductions in 1984